Santa Regina is a resort village on the coast of Río de la Plata in the Colonia Department of Uruguay, near Brisas del Plata.

Population
In 2011, Santa Regina  had a population of 52 permanent inhabitants. In spite of its low population number, it has many houses that are used during summer.
 
Source: Instituto Nacional de Estadística de Uruguay

References

External links 
 Instituto Nacional de Estadística: Plano del balneario Santa Regina

Populated places in the Colonia Department
Seaside resorts in Uruguay